Eunises Suanmi Núñez Padrón (born 24 January 2000) is a Cuban footballer who plays as a forward for the Cuba women's national team.

International career
Núñez represented Cuba at the 2020 CONCACAF Women's U-20 Championship. She capped at senior level during the 2022 CONCACAF W Championship qualification.

References

2000 births
Living people
Cuban women's footballers
Women's association football forwards
Cuba women's international footballers
21st-century Cuban women